Tessella grandis is a moth in the family Erebidae. It was described by Hervé de Toulgoët in 2002. It is found in French Guiana and Peru.

Subspecies
Tessella grandis grandis (Peru)
Tessella grandis guyanensis Toulgoët, 2002 (French Guiana)

References

Moths described in 2002
Phaegopterina